Herbert Butler was a politician.

Herbert Butler may also refer to:

Herbert Butler (footballer) (born 1906), English footballer
Bert Butler (footballer, born 1915) (1915–1999), Australian rules footballer

See also
Bert Butler (disambiguation)